Yomi: Fighting Card Game (often shortened to Yomi) is a designer card game created by David Sirlin, inspired by Super Street Fighter II Turbo. “Yomi” is Japanese for “reading,” as in reading the mind of the opponent. The Yomi card game is designed to distill the high-level mind games from fighting game tournaments into a simple card game that, itself, stands up to serious tournament play. It features asymmetric gameplay, and makes use of cards with multiple options.

Products within the series 

There are two products within the Yomi series series:

 The base set (featuring 10 characters)
 The Shadows Expansion (featuring another 10 characters)

Additionally, there are special versions of those cards, such as the EX character cards, and special edition decks, such as the G. Panda deck.

Online version 

In addition to being playable with physical cards, Yomi can be played online against human opponents or the "yomibot" AI via:
 The Yomi iOS app
 The Steam version of Yomi

Editions

Yomi, including the base set and Shadows Expansion, has been through many iterations throughout its lifetime, and is currently in its second edition.

First edition

The first edition of Yomi that was made available in 2011.

Second Edition

Yomi second edition, an update of the first edition, features:

 Several new game modes (including a 2 vs 2 and 3 vs 3 team battle, a solo mode against an automated opponent, and a 2 vs 1 mode)
 Small changes to character cards and some game mechanics

The second edition was first made available for purchase via a Kickstarter campaign ahead of retail sale.

Setting 

Yomi is set within and features characters from the Fantasy Strike universe created by David Sirlin.

Gameplay 
The objective of Yomi is similar to that of competitive fighting games like Super Street Fighter II Turbo. The first player to bring their opponent to 0 hp wins.

There are 5 types of cards available:
Attacks -  Beat throws and slower attacks. Loses to blocks and dodges.
Throws -  Beat blocks and dodges, often causing a knockdown. Loses to attacks.
Blocks -  Beat attacks and draw a card. Loses to throws and cross up attacks.
Dodges -  Beat attacks and allow for a counterattack. Loses to throws.
Jokers -  Beat attacks and throws. Loses to blocks and dodges.

Turn Sequence 
(simultaneous for both players)

Draw Phase (skip on first turn)
 Draw a card

Combat Phase
 Play a face-down card
 Reveal combat cards simultaneously
 Determine combat winner
 Loser can play face-down Joker to avoid more damage, or a bluff card, or discard their combat card to signify they're skipping this step
 Winner plays combos if applicable
 Reveal and discard Joker/bluff card
 Discard remaining combat cards at end of combat

Power Up Phase
 Discard pairs, 3-of-a-kinds, or 4-of-a-kinds to search for Aces.
 Search for more Aces if you hit with a chain combo this turn.

Awards and honors
2010 - Tom Vasel's Game of the Year
2011 - #12 on Tom Vasel's top 100 games of all time (2011 edition)
2012 - Bestcovery Best Card Game award

References

External links 
 Sirlin Games website
 David Sirlin's game design blog
 Fantasy Strike website
 Yomi wiki: Yomi community wiki 
 Online Yomi Rulesbook
 

Card games introduced in 2011
Fighting games